The 2021 MTV Europe Music Awards were held on 14 November 2021 at the László Papp Budapest Sports Arena in Budapest, Hungary. This marked the first time that Hungary hosted the awards show and as well the first event has been held in a former communist country. The show was presented by American rapper Saweetie.

Justin Bieber led the nominations, with a total of eight, making him the most nominated male artist. Doja Cat and Lil Nas X were both tied, with six nominations, with Doja being the most nominated female act. BTS was the most nominated group and K-pop act, while Little Mix was the nominated female group. The category Best K-pop was introduced this year.

Performances

Appearances
Becca Dudley – Pre-show co-host
Jack Saunders – Pre-show co-host
Rita Ora – presented Best Latin
Winnie Harlow – presented Best Hip-Hop
Joel Corry – presented Best New
Drew McIntyre – presented Best Rock
Ryan Tedder – presented Best Song
Manu Gavassi – presented Best Alternative
Olly Alexander – presented Best Video
Saweetie – presented Best Artist

Winners and nominations

Regional awards
Regional nominations were announced on 20 October 2021.

Controversy 
After the decision to hold the MTV EMA in Budapest there has been criticism for the location, because of Hungary's decision to adopt laws against the LGBT community in June 2021. President and CEO of MTV Entertainment Group Worldwide Chris McCarthy explained that no censorship by the Hungarian government will be tolerated:"As a gay man, my personal emotions got the better of me. After learning this legislation passed, my knee jerk reaction was that we should move the event to another country. However, I picked up the phone to connect with global LGBTQ+ advocates, [...] and consulted our LGBTQ+ employee resource group, Emerge. The decision was very clear to all of us, [...] we should not move the event. Instead, we should move forward, using the show as an opportunity to stand in solidarity with the LGBTQ+ community in Hungary and around the world as we continue to fight for equality for all".

Performers included Kim Petras, as the first out trans performer at the VMAs, with an act that was intentionally raunchy and "sex positive" and who spoke out to say "It's going to be pretty powerful to be in Hungary and perform the show when these laws have just happened". Other artists were also given stage time to speak out against Hungarian anti-LGBTQ+ policies, including Saweetie and Lil Nas X.

There were also announced five "Generation Change Awards", introduced by Drew Barrymore and honouring LGBTQ+ activists from Iraq, Nigeria, Brazil, the United States and Hungary, with Budapest Pride organiser Viktória Radványi accepting the award in person; the other honourees were Amir Ashour, founder of IraQueer; Matthew Blaise, founder of The Oasis Project in Nigeria; Sage Dolan-Sandrino, an Afro-Cuban queer and trans artist from the United States; and Erika Hilton, the first Black trans woman elected to the Municipal Chamber of São Paulo.

References 

mtv
2021
2021 in Hungary
November 2021 events in Hungary
Events in Budapest